Henk van Stee (born 17 December 1961 in Rotterdam, South Holland) is a former football midfielder from the Netherlands, who played for Sparta Rotterdam and De Graafschap. He retired in 1990, and became a football manager, who worked for Sparta Rotterdam, VVV-Venlo, Feyenoord Rotterdam, AZ Alkmaar and Excelsior Rotterdam. Currently he works as the youth academy director for FC Zenit Saint Petersburg.

References
 Profile 

1961 births
Living people
Footballers from Rotterdam
Dutch footballers
Dutch football managers
Association football midfielders
Sparta Rotterdam players
Sparta Rotterdam managers
Excelsior Rotterdam managers
VVV-Venlo managers
Feyenoord managers
AZ Alkmaar managers
De Graafschap players
De Graafschap managers
Eredivisie players
Eerste Divisie players
Eredivisie managers
FC Shakhtar Donetsk non-playing staff
FC Zenit Saint Petersburg non-playing staff
Dutch expatriate football managers
Expatriate football managers in Ukraine
Dutch expatriate sportspeople in Ukraine
Expatriate football managers in Russia
Dutch expatriate sportspeople in Russia